Robert Alexander Anderson (14 August 1856 - 5 December 1916) was a Canadian politician, and the fourth Mayor of Vancouver, British Columbia, serving one term in 1894. He had previously served as an alderman, from 1892 to 1893. He was born in Armagh, Ireland and died in New Westminster, British Columbia.

References

1858 births
1916 deaths
Irish emigrants to Canada (before 1923)
Mayors of Vancouver
19th-century Canadian politicians